Rumi (1207–1273) was a Persian poet, Islamic scholar, and Sufi mystic.

Rumi may also refer to:
 al-Rumi or Rumi, people with a nisba (surname) derived from the historical region(s) of the Rum
 Rumi (given name), a Japanese given name
Shafi Imam Rumi, a guerrilla fighter of the Bangladesh Liberation War
 Rumi (opera), a Persian-language opera by Behzad Abdi
 Rumi calendar, a calendar used by the Ottoman Empire
 Rumi cheese - a hard cheese from cows' milk, or from a mixture of cow and buffalo milk, produced in Egypt
 Rumi Numeral System, used in North Africa and Iberia between the 10th and 17th centuries
 Rumi script, the Malay alphabet

See also 
 Rûm